Rick Copp (born August 20, 1964) is an American television writer, story editor, producer and occasional actor.
He was an executive story editor for 11 episodes and writer for two episodes of the short-lived 1991 NBC sitcom Flesh 'n' Blood. He also wrote for Flying Blind, The Golden Girls and Wings, among others. He was a co-writer on The Brady Bunch Movie and has written for many animated series including Teen Titans and Scooby-Doo. In 2005 he served as a consulting producer on the Barbershop TV series, based on the hit movie.

He is also an author of four mystery novels, The Actor's Guide to Murder, The Actor's Guide to Adultery, The Actor's Guide to Greed and Fingerprints and Facelifts. His book The Actor's Guide to Greed was a Lambda Literary Award nominee in the Gay Mystery category at the 2006 Lambda Literary Awards. In 2012, he was one of the writers, creators and stars of the comedy mystery web series Where the Bears Are.

Filmography

References

External links

Official site

Living people
21st-century American novelists
American male novelists
American mystery writers
American television writers
American male screenwriters
American LGBT screenwriters
American gay writers
1964 births
American LGBT novelists
American male web series actors
21st-century American male actors
American gay actors
People from Bar Harbor, Maine
American male television writers
21st-century American male writers
Screenwriters from Maine
21st-century American screenwriters